This is a list of members of the Victorian Legislative Assembly from 1961 to 1964, as elected at the 1961 state election:

 On 18 March 1962, the Labor member for Richmond, Bill Towers, died. Labor candidate Clyde Holding won the resulting by-election on 12 May 1962.
 On 30 May 1962, the Liberal member for Broadmeadows, Harry Kane, died. Labor candidate John Wilton won the resulting by-election on 4 August 1962.
 On 11 September 1962, the Country member for Mildura, Nathaniel Barclay, died. Country candidate Milton Whiting won the resulting by-election on 27 October 1962.
 Moorabbin MLA Bob Suggett had been re-elected as an Independent Liberal in 1961 after losing Liberal preselection before that election. He was readmitted to the Liberal Party in 1964.

Members of the Parliament of Victoria by term
20th-century Australian politicians